The Voice Cambodia (season 2) is a Cambodian reality talent show that was aired from 6 March to 19 June 2016 on Rasmey Hang Meas HDTV.

Teams
Color key

The First Phase: The Blind Auditions
A new feature within the Blind Auditions this season is the Block, which each coach can use once to prevent one of the other coaches from getting a contestant.

Color key

Episode 1: March 06, 2016

Episode 2: March 13, 2016

Episode 3: March 20, 2016

Episode 4: March 27, 2016

Episode 5: April 03, 2016

Episode 6: April 10, 2016

The Second Phase: The Battle 

 Colour Key
  Coach hit his/her "I WANT YOU" button
  Artist defaulted to this coaches team
  Artist elected to join this coaches team
  Artist won the Battle and advanced to the Live shows
  Artist lost the Battle and was eliminated
  Artist lost the Battle but was stolen by another coach and advances to the Live shows

Episode 7: April 17, 2016

Episode 8: April 24, 2016

Episode 9: May 01, 2016

Episode 10: May 08, 2016

The Third Phase: Live Show 
  Artist automatically advanced by public vote
  Artist  was saved by coach's choice
  Artist was eliminated

Episode 11: Week 1, May 15, 2016

Episode 12: Week 2, May 22, 2016

Episode 13: Week 3, May 29, 2016

Episode 14: Week 4, June 05, 2016

Episode 15: Week 5, Semi-Final, June 12, 2016

Episode 16: Week 6, Final, June 19, 2016 
 Key
  Winner
  Runner-up

Elimination Chart

Overall

Color key
Artist's info

Result details

Cambodia
Cambodian television series
Cambodian music
2016 Cambodian television seasons